The Vega gull, East Siberian gull, or East Siberian herring gull (Larus vegae) is a large gull of the herring gull/lesser black-backed gull complex which breeds in Northeast Asia. Its classification is still controversial and uncertain. It is variously treated as a separate species, as a subspecies of the American herring gull (L. smithsonianus) or included with both the American herring gull and European herring gull in L. argentatus. The Mongolian gull, Larus mongolicus, has previously been regarded as a subspecies of the Caspian gull (L. cachinnans) but is now sometimes lumped with the Vega gull.

Description

Vega gull (Larus vegae)
The Vega gull is similar to the herring gull but is slightly darker grey above.  The head of the Vega gull is heavily streaked with brown in winter, especially on the back and sides of the neck forming a collar.  The legs are usually bright pink. First- and second-winter Vega gulls are darker than the similar Mongolian gull, notably on the crown of the head where Mongolian gulls even in first- and second-winter are a bit paler.  Almost the full body of first- and second-winter Vega gulls displays darker brown flecks and streaks.  Adult Vega gulls in winter can often be mistaken for the very similar-looking slaty-backed gull (L. schistisagus) and the western gull (L. occidentalis), but the Vega gull's gray is lighter than the two similar species.  Eye colour is variable but tends to be dark with a red orbital ring.  The bill is yellow with a red spot except for first- and second-winter gulls where the bill can be almost entirely dark gray/black, with the gray portion shrinking until it reaches maturity.

Vega gulls in the northwestern part of their breeding range are paler above. They are sometimes considered to be a separate subspecies named Birula's gull (Larus vegae birulai).

Mongolian gull  (Larus vegae mongolicus)
The back and wings of the Mongolian gull vary in colour.  They are often medium grey similar to Birula's gull but can be much darker.  The head of the Mongolian gull is mainly white all year round with only faint winter streaking.  The legs are usually pink and the eye is usually pale with a red orbital ring. The bill is yellow with a large red spot and often with dark markings in first-, second- and third-year gulls.  First- and second-winter Mongolian gulls have heavy brown/gray streaking and flecking over most of body and wings, much like the Vega gull, but not as dark.

Distribution and habitat
Vega gulls breed in northeastern Siberia and winter in Japan, Korea, southern and eastern China, and Taiwan. They are regularly seen on St. Lawrence Island and Nome, Alaska and may breed there. There are also records from other parts of western Alaska, and a few photo documented records from Washington and California. In their winter range they are typically found in harbours, on rocky shores and at river mouths.

The Mongolian gull nests in Mongolia, neighbouring parts of Russia (such as Lake Baikal), northeastern China (e.g., Lake Hulun) and possibly South Korea. It migrates southeast to winter in southern and eastern China and Korea, with small numbers reaching Japan. In South Korea, it winters on inland waters more often than the Vega gull.

References

 Paul Doherty & Bill Oddie (2001) Gulls: A Video Guide to the Gulls of Europe, Asia & North America. Videocassette. Bird Images.
John MacKinnon & Karen Phillipps (2000) A Field Guide to the Birds of China. Oxford University Press.
Craig Robson (2002) A Field Guide to the Birds of South-East Asia. New Holland, London.
George C. West (2002) A Birder's Guide to Alaska. American Birding Association.
Mark Brazil (2009) Princeton Field Guides: Birds of East Asia (China, Taiwan, Korea, Japan, and Russia). Princeton University Press .

External links
Mongolian Gull photos, Japanese Gull-Site
The "Herring Gull" Assemblage in South Korea, Birding Korea
Vega Gull photos, Japanese Gull-Site

Vega gull
Birds of North Asia
Vega gull